Family is a 1996 Indian Telugu-language drama film produced by Leela-Laila-Lalini-Lalitha under the Vijaya Bapineedu Productions banner and directed by Vijaya Bapineedu. It stars Rajendra Prasad and Ooha , with music composed by Prasanna Swaraj.  The film was a remake of the Tamil film Kaalam Maari Pochu (1996).

Plot
Shankaram and Janaki have four daughters, Kalyani, Kasthuri, Kavitha, Kamala, and a son Giri. Shankaram always thinks the son is an asset to him and that daughters are a burden on his head. He starts searching for bridegrooms for his three elder daughters with his friend Vankara Sastry, because he wants to give less dowry, he finds three different class-4 matches for his daughters and they get married to a cook, Eeswara Rao, a Corporation worker and an auto driver Krishna respectively. Three of them are wayward husbands who want to rely on their wives' property. The whole story revolves around three families, whose three wives teach a lesson to their husbands and makes their father realize his mistake.

Cast
Rajendra Prasad as Krishna
Ooha as Kavitha
Ali 
Vallabhaneni Janardhan as Shankaram
Nutan Prasad as Dr. Appa Rao
Tanikella Bharani as Cook Eeswara Rao 
Mallikarjuna Rao as Marriage Broker
A.V.S. as Vakara Sastry 
Raja Ravindra as Giri
Vinod as M.L.A.
Kovai Sarala as Kasthuri
Kinnera as Kalyani
Sangeeta as Janaki
Seetha as Kamala
Jyothi Meena as item number

Soundtrack

Music composed by Prasanna Swaraj. Lyrics were written by Bhuvana Chandra. Music released on Supreme Music Company.

References

1996 films
1990s Telugu-language films
Telugu remakes of Tamil films
Indian comedy-drama films
1996 comedy-drama films